Ephysteris confusa is a moth in the family Gelechiidae. It was described by Povolný in 1968. It is found in Afghanistan.

References

Ephysteris
Moths described in 1968